Victorine "Tory" Dent (January 1, 1958 – December 30, 2005) was an American poet, art critic, and commentator on the AIDS crisis.

Life
Dent was born in 1958 in Wilmington, Delaware. She graduated from Barnard College in 1981.  She was diagnosed with HIV when she was 30 years old.  Dent spent most of her adult life in New York City and Maine.  She married writer Sean Harvey in 1999. Throughout her adult life she produced poetry, often about her struggles and experiences living with HIV.  She died on December 30, 2005, in her apartment on the Lower East Side of Manhattan of the AIDS-associated infection PML.

Career
Dent was the author of Black Milk (Sheep Meadow Press, 2005); HIV, Mon Amour (Sheep Meadow Press, 1999), which won the 1999 James Laughlin Award and was a finalist for the National Book Critics Circle Award; and What Silence Equals (Persea Books, 1993). Her honors include grants from the Guggenheim Foundation, the Whiting Foundation, the New York Foundation for the Arts and the Money for Women/Barbara Deming Memorial Fund; the Rona Jaffe Foundation Writers' Award and three PEN American Center Grants for Writers with AIDS. Her poetry appeared in periodicals such as AGNI, Antioch Review, Kalliope, Kenyon Review, Paris Review, Partisan Review, Pequod, Ploughshares, and Fence. Dent had also written art criticism for magazines including Arts, Flash Art, and Parachute, as well as catalog essays for art exhibitions.

Bibliography
 "What Silence Equals", Persea Books 1993, 
 "HIV, Mon Amour", Sheep Meadow Press 1999, 
 "Black Milk", Sheep Meadow Press 2005,

Anthologies
 Life Sentences (1994)
 The Exact Change Yearbook (1995)
 In the Company of my Solitude (1995)
 Things Shaped in Passing (1997)

References

External links
Dent's Academy Of American Poets page
 "Tory Dent, Poet Who Wrote of Living With H.I.V., Dies at 47" (NY Times/ January 3, 2006)
 Library of Congress Webcast Interview with Tory Dent

2005 deaths
1958 births
Barnard College alumni
American art critics
AIDS-related deaths in New York (state)
American women poets
American women essayists
American women critics
Rona Jaffe Foundation Writers' Award winners
20th-century American poets
20th-century American women writers
20th-century American essayists
21st-century American women